1985 is a sequel to George Orwell's novel Nineteen Eighty-Four.

Written by Hungarian author György Dalos, originally published in 1983, this novel begins with the death of Big Brother and reflects an intermediate period between 1984 and a more optimistic future characterized with a decline in orthodoxy of the totalitarian system, struggles of the ensuing powers and the near destruction of the Oceania air force by Eurasia.

Significance
Critic Pat Harrington found the novel's emphasis on the Thought Police embracing a kind of "openness" and pressuring Party cliques through public opinion to be a prescient look at what Mikhail Gorbachev was to attempt in the former Soviet Union with glasnost and perestroika. Rather than ruling by fear, the secret police would attempt to control "the public sphere," bringing people to their cause of their own free will.

In other languages

In other languages the book is named
 1985: un recit historique, hong kong, 2036 
 1985: A Historical Report (Hongkong 2036)
 1985: történelmi jelentés

References

1983 science fiction novels
Dystopian novels
Hungarian science fiction novels
Works based on Nineteen Eighty-Four
Sequel novels
Fiction set in 1985